Paul Tito (born 9 June 1978) is a retired New Zealand rugby union player. He played in the lock position.

Playing career

Tito attended New Plymouth Boys' High School and represented New Zealand at U19 level in 1997, U21level from 1998–1999, and the New Zealand Māori in 2000–2001 and 2003. He played for the Waikato Chiefs and Hurricanes in Super Rugby, and played for Taranaki in the Air New Zealand Cup.

Tito, was out of contract at the end of the 2007 Super 14 season, bolstered the Cardiff Blues squad following that year's World Cup. On arrival in the Welsh capital he was given the job of turning the Blues failing line out around which he did with ease. He was appointed captain the following season replacing Xavier Rush who had stood down from the role. In his first season as captain he steered the region to the EDF Energy Cup Final, beating Gloucester Rugby by 50–12 on 18 April 2009 and he won the Man of the Match award for his efforts.

After a season full with injuries, Tito decided to retire at the end of the 2011/12 season.

Coaching career

Tito moved into coaching and has worked with:
 the Taranaki Bulls 
 Pau in France 
 the Western Force 
 the Wellington Lions.

He was in charge of the forwards for the Georgia national rugby union team, under head coach Levan Maisashvili, in 2022 when they beat Wales.  

In December 2022 he replaced Ben Afeaki in the Auckland Blues coaching group as an assistant under Leon MacDonald.

References

External links
Cardiff profile
ESPN Scrum Profile

1978 births
Cardiff Rugby players
People educated at New Plymouth Boys' High School
Living people
New Zealand rugby union players
Rugby union locks
Barbarian F.C. players
Māori All Blacks players
Taranaki rugby union players
Hurricanes (rugby union) players
New Zealand expatriate sportspeople in Wales
Rugby union players from Manawatū-Whanganui